2906 Caltech, provisional designation , is an asteroid from the outer region of the asteroid belt, approximately 56 kilometers in diameter. It was discovered on 13 January 1983 by American astronomer Carolyn Shoemaker at Palomar Observatory in the United States. It is named after the California Institute of Technology.

Orbit and classification 

Caltech orbits the Sun in the outer main-belt at a distance of 2.8–3.5 AU once every 5 years and 8 months (2,058 days). Its orbit has an eccentricity of 0.11 and an inclination of 31° with respect to the ecliptic.

Physical characteristics 

In the SMASS taxonomy, Caltech is a Xc-type asteroid, which transitions between the core X and carbonaceous C types.

Rotation period 

Between 2006 and 2012, a total of 3 rotational lightcurves of Caltech were obtained from photometric observations by Italian amateur astronomers Silvano Casulli and Federico Manzini as well as at the Palomar Transient Factory in California. Lightcurve analysis gave a concurring rotation period of 12.99 hours with a brightness variation between 0.16 and 0.27 magnitude.

Diameter and albedo 

According to the surveys carried out by the Infrared Astronomical Satellite IRAS, the Japanese Akari satellite, and NASA's Wide-field Infrared Survey Explorer with its subsequent NEOWISE mission, Caltech measures between 50.83 and 61.07 kilometers in diameter, and its surface has an albedo between 0.048 and 0.06. The Collaborative Asteroid Lightcurve Link derives an albedo of 0.0438 and a diameter of 57.88 kilometers using an absolute magnitude of 12.2.

Naming 

This minor planet is named after the California Institute of Technology, Caltech, which is the owner and operator of the discovering Palomar Observatory. The discovery was made with the 0.46-m Schmidt telescope, the first telescope installed on Palomar. The official naming citation was published by the Minor Planet Center on 22 September 1983.

References

External links 
 Asteroid Lightcurve Database (LCDB), query form (info )
 Dictionary of Minor Planet Names, Google books
 Asteroids and comets rotation curves, CdR – Observatoire de Genève, Raoul Behrend
 Discovery Circumstances: Numbered Minor Planets (1)-(5000) – Minor Planet Center
 
 

002906
Discoveries by Carolyn S. Shoemaker
Named minor planets
002906
19830113